Beaivváš Sámi Našunálateáhter (established in 1981 in Guovdageaidnu Kautokeino) is a Norwegian theatre that uses Sami language as its performing language. In addition, it is the only Sami-language theatre in the country. According to the website, "the aim of BST is to form and activate our own cultural sources, to inspire, renew, motivate, to broaden and to bring forward the Sami culture, as well as to create kinship and understanding between different cultures."

Beaivváš started as an independent theatre group in 1981, but since 1991 has been supported by the Norwegian government, and since 2002 by the Sami Parliament. It has cooperated artistically and educationally with the Sámi University College, the theater college in Luleå, Music in Finnmark, the Sami Theater in Kiruna, Åarjelhsaemien Teatere in Mo i Rana and Tärnaby, along with Hålogaland Teater. In 2005, they toured Scandinavia with the production Skuolfi. Since 2007, the theater is once again run by original manager Haukur J. Gunnarsson. It employs four actors, two technicians and four administrative employees. There are plans in place to relocate the theatre from the Kautokeino Cultural Center to a new building.

Managers 
 1991 – 1996 Haukur J. Gunnarsson
 1997 – 2002 Alex Scherpf
 2002 – 2006 Harriet Nordlund
 2007 – Haukur J. Gunnarsson

References

External links
Official website

Theatres in Norway
Sámi in Norway
Kautokeino